Thomonde is a commune in the Hinche Arrondissement, in the Centre department of Haiti. It is located in the Centre or "Plateau Central", arrondissement Hinche. The geo-coordinates are 19.02N and 71.97W. The population was about 2,381 in 1982 (Haiti census) and about 3,784 in 2007 - as reported by the government of Haiti.

The economy of the town relies on sugar cane, rapadou, tobacco, bananas, and coffee.

External links
 Thomonde Online and photos of the people of Thomonde 
 Radio WFHX FaematAIR of Thomonde

References

Populated places in Centre (department)
Communes of Haiti